Ernesto Reyes may refer to:

 Ernesto Reyes (footballer) (born 1991), Mexican footballer
 Ernesto Reyes (badminton) (born 1992), Cuban badminton player